Jules Brandeleer was a Belgian water polo player. He competed in the men's tournament at the 1928 Summer Olympics.

See also
 Belgium men's Olympic water polo team records and statistics
 List of men's Olympic water polo tournament goalkeepers

References

External links
 

Year of birth missing
Year of death missing
Belgian male water polo players
Water polo goalkeepers
Olympic water polo players of Belgium
Water polo players at the 1928 Summer Olympics
Place of birth missing